Frank Luhovy (April 16, 1943 – May 24, 2016), known as Cowboy Frankie Laine, was a Canadian professional wrestler.

Professional wrestling career

Laine wrestled throughout Canada, Puerto Rico, and various parts of the United States. His career started in 1966 as a baby face along with his valet Peggy Laine in Ontario and later in Alberta. Into the early-1970s he wrestled in California and headlined cards in Los Angeles against Goliath and Black Gordman. In the mid-to-late-1970s he was again in Alberta at Stampede Wrestling. Into 1980 he was in the Detroit and Toronto areas. As well he teamed with Dutch Mantel as heels in a bloody feud against Carlos Colon and Victor Jovica as Los Vaqueros Locos and helped sell out the Hiram Bithorn Stadium in Hato Rey, Puerto Rico for 13 weeks straight. In 1985 he worked as a prelim wrestler for the WWF losing to their main stars mostly on TV shows. Luhovy also worked as a promoter for WWE in London, Ontario.

Post Retirement
After retiring from wrestling, Laine ran his family's 700-acre farm in Alvinston, Ontario. When Owen Hart was accidentally killed in a wrestling stunt, Laine claimed that promoters' greed had led to Hart's death.

Death
Laine died in Petrolia, Ontario on May 24, 2016 of multiple sclerosis.

Championships and accomplishments
Continental Wrestling Association
NWA Mid-America Heavyweight Championship (1 time) 
Mid-Pacific Promotions
NWA Hawaii Heavyweight Championship (1 time) 
NWA Hollywood Wrestling
NWA Americas Heavyweight Championship (1 time) 
Pacific Northwest Wrestling
NWA Pacific Northwest Tag Team Championship (3 times) - with Moondog Mayne (1), Bobby Nichols (1) and Big Snuka (1).
Stampede Wrestling
Stampede North American Heavyweight Championship (2 times)
Stampede Wrestling International Tag Team Championship (1 time) - with Les Thorton (1) 
World Wrestling Council
NWA North American Tag Team Championship (Puerto Rico/WWC version) (3 times) - with Dutch Mantel (3)

References

1943 births
2016 deaths
20th-century professional wrestlers
Canadian male professional wrestlers
Professional wrestlers from Ontario
Stampede Wrestling alumni
Stampede Wrestling International Tag Team Champions
Stampede Wrestling North American Heavyweight Champions
NWA Americas Tag Team Champions
NWA Americas Heavyweight Champions